Diphilus,, a Greek physician of Siphnus, one of the Cyclades, who was a contemporary of Lysimachus, king of Thrace, about the beginning of the 3rd century BC. He wrote a work entitled, On Diet fit for Persons in good and bad Health, which is frequently quoted by Athenaeus, but of which nothing remains but the short fragments preserved by him.

Notes

3rd-century BC Greek physicians
Year of birth missing
Year of death missing